Tadej Golob (born 1967) is a Slovene mountaineer and writer.

Golob was born in Maribor in 1967 and grew up in the small town of Lenart v Slovenskih goricah in northeastern Slovenia. He moved to Ljubljana to study journalism but never completed his studies. He worked as a contributor to various magazines, but is known in Slovenia chiefly as an alpine climber.

In 2010 Golob won the Kresnik Award for best novel with his debut novel  (Pigs' Legs). It is a witty story of an aspiring comics artist looking for inspiration, trying to make ends meet and coping on the margin with a non-existent career, his family and society. The title refers to the lead character's attempt to master the art of tattooing by practicing on pigs' legs.

Published works
 Z Everesta, travelogue about skiing down Mount Everest (2000) co-written with Davo Karničar and Urban Golob
 , a selection of his contributions from Slovene edition of Playboy magazine, (2005)
 , biography of Zoran Predin, (2008)
 , novel, (2009)
 Peter Vilfan, biography of Peter Vilfan, (2010)
 , youth novel, (2011)
 , novel, (2013)
 , youth novel, (2013)
 Jezero, crime novel, (2016)
 Leninov park, crime novel, (2018)
  (Eng. Indecent lawyer), biography of Peter Čeferin, (2018)
 , crime novel, (2019)
 Virus, crime novel, (2020)

References

External links
 on publisher's official site Litera publishing house Maribor

Sportspeople from Maribor
Living people
Slovenian mountain climbers
Kresnik Award laureates
1967 births
Writers from Maribor